is a mountain with an altitude of 769 m located in the Suzuka Mountains, in Mie and Shiga Prefectures. It is located within Suzuka Quasi-National Park.

References

Mountains of Mie Prefecture
Mountains of Shiga Prefecture